Kalininsk is a town and the administrative center of Kalininsky District in Saratov Oblast, Russia, located on the Balanda River (Medveditsa's tributary),  west of Saratov, the administrative center of the oblast. Population: .

History
It was founded in 1680 as the village of Balanda, named so after the Balanda River, whose name in turn is possibly derived from a dialectal word indicating the river's windiness. In 1962, Balanda was granted town status and renamed Kalininsk after Mikhail Kalinin, a Bolshevik revolutionary and Soviet politician.

Administrative and municipal status
Within the framework of administrative divisions, Kalininsk serves as the administrative center of Kalininsky District, to which it is directly subordinated. As a municipal division, the town of Kalininsk is incorporated within Kalininsky Municipal District as Kalininsk Urban Settlement.

References

Notes

Sources

Е. М. Поспелов (Ye. M. Pospelov). "Имена городов: вчера и сегодня (1917–1992). Топонимический словарь." (City Names: Yesterday and Today (1917–1992). Toponymic Dictionary.) Москва, "Русские словари", 1993.

External links
Official website of Kalininsk 
Kalininsk Business Directory 

Cities and towns in Saratov Oblast
Atkarsky Uyezd